Pahur may refer to:
Pahur, Maharashtra, a city in India
Guide Rock (hill), a landform in the United States, called "Pahur" in the Pawnee language